Risky Business is a 1926 silent film comedy romance directed by Alan Hale and starring Vera Reynolds, Ethel Clayton and Zasu Pitts. It was produced by Cecil B. DeMille's Producers Distributing Corporation.

Prints are preserved of the film and it is available on the DVD home video.

Cast
Vera Reynolds - Cecily Stoughton
Ethel Clayton - Mrs. Stoughton
Kenneth Thomson - Ted Pyncheon, M.D.
Ward Crane - Richard Coults-Browne
Louis Natheaux - Lawrence Wheaton
Zasu Pitts - Agnes Wheaton
Dorothy Brock - Sally, the Cream of Wheatons
George Irving -Schubal Peabody
Louise Cabo - Hefty Helga

References

External links
Risky Business at IMDb.com

1926 films
American silent feature films
Films directed by Alan Hale
American black-and-white films
Producers Distributing Corporation films
1926 romantic comedy films
American romantic comedy films
1920s American films
Silent romantic comedy films
Silent American comedy films